Eli Heil (1929–2017) was a Brazilian painter, sculptor, ceramicist, tapestry maker and poet. She exhibited on numerous occasions in Brazil and abroad.

Early life
Eli Malvina Heil was born in 1929 in Palhoça in Santa Catarina State in Brazil. She spent her childhood and youth in the neighbouring municipality of Santo Amaro da Imperatriz, becoming a physical education teacher. She eventually moved to Florianópolis, where she taught physical education at a college, before dedicating herself fully to artistic activity from 1962.

Artistic work
Heil was self-taught. Her work followed a unique style and galleries always found difficulty in classifying her, variously using "art brut", "naïve art", "primitive art", "innate art" or, even "unusual art". Initially, she drew animals and painted landscapes of hills with houses based on the urban landscape of Florianópolis, using thick layers of paint and saturated colours. In 1962, she held her first solo exhibition, in Florianópolis. She then began to develop three-dimensional objects, applying rag dolls to the surface of a canvas and creating imaginary beings with different materials, such as ceramics, cement, wood, mortar and melted plastics, resulting in hybrid beings composed of human, animal and mythological characters. She had a show at the Museum of Contemporary Art of the University of São Paulo (MAC-USP) in 1966. Two years later, she started to exhibit in Europe. She participated in the First Latin American Biennial of São Paulo, in 1978, and in the 16th International Biennial of São Paulo in 1981. The Santa Catarina Art Museum (MASC) held a retrospective exhibition of her work in 1982.

O Mundo Ovo
In 1987, she created O Mundo Ovo (The Egg World) in Florianópolis where she set up her studio and a space for the permanent exhibition of her art, bringing together a collection of over 3000 works. Many of her sculptures are displayed in the museum's garden. These included totems called Adam and Eve, polychrome sculptures over three metres high, which stood at the entrance to the museum. However, they had to be removed in 1990 as a result of road widening. Heil then buried them in a "cemetery" in the garden. In 1994, her O Mundo Ovo Foundation officially opened. It also has an archive of books, catalogues, printed matter and other documents associated with Heil.

Death
Heil died in Florianópolis from a heart attack on 10 September 2017. She had suffered from asthma for years and had had severe respiratory attacks.

Solo exhibitions
Heil's solo exhibitions were:
1962 - Florianópolis - Galeria Baú
1963 - Rio de Janeiro - Instituto Brasil-Estados Unidos (IBEU)
1963 - Brasília - Alliance Française
1964 - Rio de Janeiro - IBEU
1964 - Florianópolis - Federal University of Santa Catarina
1966 - Florianópolis - Santa Catarina Art Museum (MASC)
1966 - São Paulo SP - Museum of Contemporary Art of the University of São Paulo - MAC/USP
1967 - Paris (France) - Individual, at Solstice Gallery
1967 - Florianópolis - Federal University of Santa Catarina. 
1968 - Ibiza - Ivan Spence Gallery
1968 - Paris - Galerie M. Benezite
1968 - Porto Alegre - Rio Grande do Sul Museum of Art (MARGS)
1969 - Amsterdam - Galeria Espace
1969 - Florianópolis - MASC
1971 - Florianópolis - MASC
1971 - Paris - Solstice Gallery
1971 - Rio de Janeiro - Galeria Barcinski
1971 - Amsterdam - Galerie Espace
1971 - Blumenau - Galeria Açu-Açu
1973 - Copenhagen - Louisiana Museum
1973 - Oslo - Sorya Henis Onstad Museum
1973 - Paris - Debret Gallery
1973 - Paris - L'Oeil de Boeuf Gallery
1973 - Paris - M. Benezite Gallery
1974 - Florianópolis - MASC
1974 - São Paulo - Galeria Oca
1977 - Paris - L'Oeil de Boeuf Gallery
1978 - Paris - L'Oeil de Boeuf Gallery
1982 - Florianópolis - MASC
1984 - Florianópolis - Retrospective at MASC
1984 - Paris - L'Oeil de Boeuf Gallery
1986 - Brasília - Retrospective at the Brasília Art Museum
1986 - Florianópolis - MASC
1989 - Paris - L'Oeil de Boeuf Gallery
1990 - Florianópolis - MASC
1992 - Florianópolis - “30 years of Art”, at the Santa Catarina Association of Plastic Artists (ACAP)
1993 - Florianópolis - AABB Cultural Space
1995 - Florianópolis - “66 Years of Life”, at the Development Bank of Santa Catarina (BADESC)

References

External links
 Film about her work

1929 births
2017 deaths
20th-century Brazilian women
21st-century Brazilian women
People from Santa Catarina (state)
Brazilian women sculptors
Brazilian women painters